Dmitri Vladimirovich Bugakov (born 19 June 1979) is a Russian former professional footballer.

Club career
He made his professional debut in the Russian First Division in 1997 for FC Metallurg Lipetsk.

Honours
 Russian Premier League champion: 2001.

References

1979 births
Sportspeople from Lipetsk
Living people
Russian footballers
Russia under-21 international footballers
Association football midfielders
Association football defenders
FC Spartak Moscow players
Russian Premier League players
FC Salyut Belgorod players
FC Sokol Saratov players
FC Metallurg Lipetsk players